Nurdle or Nerdle may refer to:

Nurdle (bead), a pre-production microplastic pellet about the size of a pea
Plastic resin pellet pollution, nurdles as marine debris
Nurdle, a term used in cricket; see List of cricket terms
Nerdle (game), a numbers-based Wordle-type game
The depiction of a wave-shaped blob of toothpaste sitting on a toothbrush.

See also
Noodle (disambiguation)